This is a list of electoral results for the Electoral district of South-West Coast in Victorian state elections.

Members for South-West Coast

Election results

Elections in the 2020s

Elections in the 2010s

Elections in the 2000s

References

 

Victoria (Australia) state electoral results by district